Raven Riley is an Italian American former pornographic actress, appearing online and on DVDs. Riley won the top spot on Front magazine's "Top 20 Girls of the Web" and appeared on its March 2007 cover.

Career
Riley started modeling in 2004 after first accompanying a friend to a bikini model shoot. She met Jay Man, who was a content producer, and he shot her for amateurfacials.com. Jay Man, his business partner, and Riley started a company called Third Pentacle which launched her solo website in December 2004. Riley, with partners from jaYManCash and Third Pentacle, started Evil Motion Pictures, whose goal was to break into mainstream horror movie production. Evil Motion Pictures released its first horror porn film starring Riley in November 2007, which was entitled Succubus.

In May 2008, Thomas Leach, the owner of jaYManCash, announced that the rumors that Riley was leaving the adult industry were true, saying "while no official documents have been signed, Raven has communicated that the adult industry is no longer in her future and she was going to leave the adult industry." Riley contacted XBIZ and disputed the rumors and reports: "I am still here and I’m not retired... That was false information that was given." As a result of a lawsuit, Leach took full ownership of Third Pentacle. This dispute also affected their relationship with Interactive Life Forms, the company that makes Fleshlight. Leach sued both Riley and ILF, alleging trademark infringement for continuing to use Riley's name in selling their Fleshlight. Leach settled with ILF in 2010.

Her last shoot for her site was posted in 2012, and the site was taken offline in 2014 with the page showing only a link to The Wayback Machine and their PetaBox. As of April 2018, the domain redirects to religious material. On June 3, 2016, documentary filmmaker David Pilot debuted Skin in the Game: The Raven Riley Story at the New Haven Documentary Film Festival in New Haven, Connecticut, following Raven's rise into and departure from online pornography.

Online scam
Raven Riley's photos have been used by online scammers to defraud men looking for sexual encounters through social networking sites since at least 2007.

References

External links

 
 

Living people
American female adult models
American Internet celebrities
American people of Italian descent
American pornographic film actresses
1986 births
21st-century American women